The Mirna is a river in Istria, Croatia. In ancient times it was called the Aquilis. It rises near Buzet, passes along Motovun and empties into the Adriatic Sea near Novigrad.

References

External links
 Development of the Mirna River Basin Management Plan
 Geological & hydrological data

Rivers of Croatia
Landforms of Istria County
Drainage basins of the Adriatic Sea